Bye Bye is the sixth solo studio album of the Italian singer-songwriter Annalisa, published on 16 February 2018 by label Warner Music Italy.

Promotion 
The release of Bye Bye was anticipated by two singles. The first was "Direzione la vita" while the second was "Il mondo prima di te", published on 6 February 2018 and ranked third at Sanremo Music Festival 2018. Through the digital pre-order of the album "Bianco nero e grigio", the promotional single of the album, was made available for listening.

Track listing

Charts

Certifications

References

2018 albums
Annalisa albums